The 2017 Birmingham Bowl was a college football bowl game played on December 23, 2017, at Legion Field in Birmingham, Alabama, United States.  The twelfth edition of the Birmingham Bowl featured the Texas Tech Red Raiders of the Big 12 Conference against the South Florida Bulls of the American Athletic Conference.  Kickoff was scheduled for 11:00 AM CST and the game aired on ESPN.  It was one of the 2017–18 bowl games concluding the 2017 FBS football season.

Teams
The game featured the Texas Tech Red Raiders against the South Florida Bulls and was the first-ever meeting between the two schools.

Texas Tech Red Raiders

This was the Red Raiders' first Birmingham Bowl.

South Florida Bulls

South Florida entered the game as the defending Birmingham Bowl champion, their 2016 team having defeated the South Carolina Gamecocks, 46–39 in overtime.  This was the Bulls' third Birmingham Bowl; in addition to their 2016 victory, the 2006 Bulls defeated the East Carolina Pirates, 24–7 in the inaugural game when it was known as the PapaJohns.com Bowl.

Game summary

Scoring Summary

Statistics

References

2017–18 NCAA football bowl games
2017
2017
2017
2017 in sports in Alabama
December 2017 sports events in the United States